Ōno Castle  (大野城跡 Ōnojō-ato) is a ruined castle located on Mount Shioji (formerly called Mount Ōno) in the northern part of Dazaifu city in Fukuoka Prefecture, Japan.

History 
Construction began in 665 AD, after the defeat of the combined Japanese and Baekje forces by the Tang-Silla alliance at the Battle of Baekgang in 663. Fearing an invasion from the continent, the Japanese Yamato court is thought to have ordered the construction of the fortification to help protect the Daizaifu government center. Today the ruins of about seventy buildings can be seen, including buildings once used for storehouses, temples, and kitchens.  A wall surrounded this area, built partly of stone, partly of earth. Sections of the wall still exist.  This area is a Special Historic Site (特別史跡). Mizuki Castle was built nearby, also to protect Daizaifu.

See also 
 Ōno Castle (Echizen Province)
 Ōno Castle (Chita District, Owari Province)
 List of foreign-style castles in Japan

External links 
 Japan Atlas
 Daizaifu, City of Ancient Culture See item 4

Special Historic Sites
Buildings and structures in Dazaifu, Fukuoka
Archaeological sites in Japan
Tourist attractions in Fukuoka Prefecture
Former populated places in Japan
History of Fukuoka Prefecture
Parks and gardens in Fukuoka Prefecture
Castles in Fukuoka Prefecture
Asuka period
7th century in Japan